St. Helens entered their 136th year in rugby in 2010, their 115th in rugby league, and are in contention for the Super League, in its 15th Season, and the 109th Challenge Cup.

League table

Colours
St Helens stuck with tradition in selecting their home kit for 2010, with a white and red "vee" jersey, similar to the one worn by stars like Alex Murphy and Tom van Vollenhoven in the 1960s. The away kit is a striking, new colour combination never before seen by the Knowsley Road faithful, a sharp blue jersey with a white "vee" and red trim within the "vee". St Helens also launched a commemorative heritage strip that celebrates St Helens' 110th and final season at Knowsley Road.

Sponsors
St Helens home jersey for 2010 is sponsored by Frontline Bathrooms, who continue their partnership with the club from last year. St Helens away jersey has a different sponsor, with healthcare cash plan provider Medicash sponsoring the front of the jersey.

Below is a list of St Helens sponsors and partners for 2010:

Pre-season
St Helens offset the loss of Jason Cayless, Lee Gilmour and Sean Long with the signings of prop forward Nick Fozzard (returning to the club after a year at Hull Kingston Rovers), centre Iosia Soliola from Sydney Roosters and hooker Scott Moore returning from loan spells at Castleford Tigers in 2008 and Huddersfield Giants in 2009. The club also promoted youngsters Jack Bradbury, a centre, and stand-off Lee Gaskell. Matty Smith and Steve Tyrer are again let out on loan, this time both players leaving for Salford City Reds for the season, whilst Chris Dean was "dual-registered" with Widnes Vikings. St Helens saw no coaching change despite finishing trophy-less for the first time in 4 years and some fans calling for the sacking of head coach Mick Potter. The club's pre-season went well, defeating Widnes and Halifax convincingly before the Under 21s fell to a 44-0 loss to Keighley Cougars.

2010 results and fixtures

Friendlies

Sunday 27 December
St Helens vs. Wigan Warriors (off due to icy pitch)

Tuesday 19 January (Karalius Cup)
Widnes Vikings 26-42 St Helens

Friday 22 January (Mike Bennett Testimonial match)
St Helens 38-18 Halifax

Sunday 24 January
St Helens (Under 21s) 0-44 Keighley Cougars

Super League XV

Round 1
St Helens vs Hull

Preview:
The game will see former talismanic scrum-half and captain Sean Long return to Knowsley Road with his new side Hull; ironically as captain. The St Helens squad sees Francis Meli absent as the big Kiwi and Samoa wing is in his native Samoa on compassionate grounds. His place is likely to be taken by Gary Wheeler or Jonny Lomax. Elsewhere, Saints are at full strength, with no place available for second-rows Matty Ashurst or Andy Dixon or prop Gareth Frodsham in the initial 19-man squad.

St Helens 12-32 Hull

St Helens' season got off to the worst possible start with a crushing loss to Hull at a foggy Knowsley Road. Despite a strong start, making good yardage and showing signs of the Saints flair of the Millward and Anderson eras, Saints failed to execute throughout and their defence proved leaky with Willie Manu cantering over in the 25th minute. Epalahame Lauaki barged over 12 minutes after brushing off Leon Pryce, following more shocking defence from the five-time champions, and Hull continued to press after half-time, with Sean Long returning to haunt his former employers in a man-of-the-match performance, and Tom Briscoe adding scores to make the game safe with a 26-0 scoreline. Saints hit back through quick-fire tires from Matt Gidley and Chris Flannery, but again, the finishing touch was found lacking in vital areas, meaning they could not pull off a comeback of old. Kirk Yeaman competed the win in the 75th minute after latching on to a Craig Fitzgibbon hack-on. No doubt, St Helens must improve on their basics should they want to trouble Leeds and usual pace-setters in the top four.

Round 2
Bradford Bulls vs St Helens

Preview:
The game sees St Helens' big winger Francis Meli return to the initial 19-man squad for the round 2 game at the Odsal Stadium. second-row Matty Ashurst also comes back into contention for Saints. They take the places of centre Iosia Soliola who is out for three to four weeks with an ankle problem and wing Ade Gardner who has and intercostal muscle injury and is out of contention for six to eight weeks. Talismanic hooker and skipper Keiron Cunningham was due to earn his 500th cap in the professional game but missed the fixture due to a family bereavement.

Bradford Bulls 6-38 St Helens

St Helens got back to winning ways after the week previous' crushing loss to Hull with a resounding win at Bradford. Saints started the game well, with Jon Wilkin opening the scoring in the 12th minute. From this St Helens kicked on, Kyle Eastmond kicking a penalty before full-back Paul Wellens scored two of his eventual four tries before the half-hour mark. Saints continued the pressure after the half-time break with Eastmond intercepting and going 80 metres in the 48th minute. Bradford applied the pressure for fifteen minutes, but a mixture of awesome defence and poor decision making from the Bulls meant Saints kept them at nil. Wellens added his third and fourth in the 65th and 71st minutes before Bradford responded through a Matt Orford try and goal; a scant consolation score in the final moments of the game. A mention must go to Leon Pryce who had a hand in no less than 3 of his sides tries against his former employers. St Helens look to be back to their destructive best, and this win may relieve the pressure on under-fire coach Mick Potter.

Catalans Dragons vs St HelensPreview:St Helens will be looking to build upon last week's first win of the season at Bradford. However, they do not boast a healthy record at the Stade Gilbert Brutus, winning only twice over four seasons. Andy Dixon earns a recall, whilst Jack Bradbury could make his St Helens début in the game after being named in his maiden 19-man squad. Chris Flannery misses out on the game through a shoulder injury, and he joins Iosia Soliola (ankle) and Ade Gardner (rib cartilage) on the injury list. Keiron Cunningham does not travel due to a family bereavement, as he still awaits his 500th game at professional level.

Catalans Dragons 12-42 St HelensSt Helens got back-to-back wins after a comfortable win over the Dragons in Perpignan. However, it was the Dragons who got the better of the opening exchanges, with Setaimata Sa and Chris Walker going over inside the first ten minutes. Neither scores were converted, but Catalans had an 8-0 lead. However, on the 15 minute mark, Saints found their cutting edge and began to tick, with young winger Jonny Lomax latching on to an inch-perfect Paul Wellens chip. Despite James Graham being off the field with  suspected concussion and Jonny Lomax being caught by a dangerous tackle by Olivier Elima which resulted in the French captain's sending off, St Helens pressed on and it was Lomax, who shrugged off the shot from Elima to cut inside his opposing winger to score a brilliant try. Kyle Eastmond scored a goal from the touchline for a 10-8 St Helens lead, and with the extra man advantage, it was looking ominous for the Dragons. Francis Meli got his first of the season after a fine kick form the in-form Leon Pryce, and shortly after, Matt Gidley cut back inside his winger to finish a fine move for the first of his two tries of the evening. Half-time - 8-18 to Saints. The second-half continued in a similar guise, with Maurie Fa'asavalu scoring a trade-mark, barnstorming try under the posts. Eastmond was next to score, Gidley cutting through the defence and flicking the ball back on the inside to Eastmond who sped 30 meters for a fine try. Meli then crossed for his second, finishing well a break from Matty Ashurst. Gidley then got his brace, with a trademark, show and go on the outside to score. That was the end of the St Helens scoring, but by no means the end of the action, with Bryn Hargreaves and Scott Moore involved in a brawl with the Catalans forwards. Walker got his second with five minutes remaining, but the win was in the bag by the hour mark.

Round 4St Helens vs Wakefield Trinity WildcatsPreview:The game will St Helens' talismanic skipper Keiron Cunningham return to the fold to make his 500th appearance in professional rugby, following the sudden death of his mother, Annie. However, winger Ade Gardner and centre Sia Soliola still miss out through rib and ankle injuries respectively. Also, second rowers Jon Wilkin and Chris Flannery will both miss the game with shoulder problems, therefore meaning Matty Ashurst will deputise for his first appearance of 2010.St Helens''' 22-16 Wakefield Trinity Wildcats

St Helens made it three consecutive wins with a hard-fought if scrappy win over the in-form Wakefield. Despite a strong, assured start from the Drednaughts with tries from Daryl Millard and young Dale Morton inside the first ten minutes, St Helens finally got going and got onto the scoreboard on 27 minutes with Jonny Lomax notching his third in four games. They continued to apply the pressure in the second half with scores from Kyle Eastmond, Francis Meli and Keiron Cunningham scoring on this landmark game for the hooker. Wakefield applied pressure late on with Millard getting his second, but St Helens held on for the win.

Round 6
St Helens 37 Crusaders 30

2010 transfers

Acquisitions

Losses

Current squad

References

St Helens R.F.C. seasons
St Helens RLFC